Ali Mohamed or Ali Mohammed or Ali Mohammad may refer to:

Ali Mohamed
Mohamed as surname
 Ali Mohamed (double agent) (born 1952), a double agent who worked for both the CIA and Egyptian Islamic Jihad simultaneously
 Ali Mohamed (footballer) (born 1995), Nigerien footballer
 Ali Adnan Mohamed, Iraqi archer 
 Ali Moalim Mohamed, Somali businessman and politician
 Ali Mohamud Mohamed, Kenyan politician
 Ali Naseer Mohamed (born 1969), Maldivian diplomat
 Ali Yassin Mohamed (born 1965), Somali-Swedish Islamist militant

Mohamed as middle name or Ali Mohamed as given name
Ali Mohamed Al-Balooshi (born 1987), Emirati middle-distance runner
Ali Mohamed Daoud, also known as Jean-Marie (born 1950), Djiboutian politician and the President of the Front for the Restoration of Unity and Democracy
Ali Mohamed Hufane (born 1960), Somali long-distance runner
Ali Mohamed Jaffer (born 1955), South Yemeni boxer and Olympian 
Ali Mohamed Mohamud, Somali politician and government minister
Ali Mohamed Muheeb, Egyptian diver
Ali Mohamed Osoble, Somali politician and Member of Parliament
Ali Mohamed Shein (born 1948), 7th President of Zanzibar from 2010 to 2020
Ali Mohamed Yussuf (born 1952), more commonly known as Ali Guray, Somaliland politician
Ali Mohamed Warancadde, Somali politician

Ali Mohamed as a surname
Abdallah Ali Mohamed (born 1999), Comorian footballer 
Abdullahi Ali Mohamed, Somali politician, second president of the unrecognized Himan and Heeb until the merger with Galmudug in 2015
Ali Heidar Ali Mohamed, Kuwaiti judoka

Ali Mohammad
Ali Mohammad (politician), Afghan politician
ʿAlī-Moḥammad ben Moḥammad-Reżâ Bâb or simply Báb (1819–1850), the founder of Bábism, and one of the central figures of the Baháʼí Faith

Mohammad as middle name or Ali Mohammad as given name
Ali Mohammad Dar, Indian politician and Member of Legislative Council in the Union Territory of Jammu & Kashmir 
Ali Mohammad Dastgheib Shirazi, (born 1935), Iranian Grand Ayatollah and Twelver Shi'a Marja
Ali Mohammad Afghani (born 1925), Iranian writer
Ali-Mohammad Khademi (1913–1978), Iranian businessman, general manager of Iran Air
Ali Mohammad Mahar (1967–2019), Pakistani politician who served as the 25th Chief Minister of Sindh from 2002 to 2004 and then as the Federal Minister for Narcotics Control between 2018 and 2019.
Ali-Mohammad Mirza whose royal title was Ehtesham-ol-Mamalek, was the third son of Khanlar Mirza
Ali Mohammad Momeni (born 1937), Iranian wrestler
Ali Mohammad Sagar, member of Jammu and Kashmir Legislative Assembly 
Ali Mohammad Shahbaz (born Ali Mohammad Qureshi, 1939–1996) known by his pen name Shahbaz, Kashmiri revolutionary poet

Ali Mohammed
Ali Mohammed Ghedi, (born 1952), popularly known as Ali Gedi, Prime Minister of the Transitional Federal Government (TFG) of Somalia from 2004 to 2007

Places
Ali Mohammad Bazar, a village in Iran
Ali Mohammad Beygi, a village in Iran
Ali Mohammad Zeytun, a village in Iran
Ali Mohammadi, a village in Iran
Cheshmeh-ye Ali Mohammad, a village in Iran
Qaleh-ye Ali Mohammad, a village in Iran

See also
 Mohammad Ali (disambiguation)